The Legislative Council of New Brunswick was the upper house of the government of the British colony and later Canadian province of New Brunswick between 1785 and 1891.

Members were appointed by the New Brunswick governor.

Council chambers

The former chambers of the council are now used for committee meetings by the legislative assembly.

See also

Legislative Council

External links
 Legislative Assembly of New Brunswick website

References 

New Brunswick Legislature
1785 establishments in New Brunswick
1891 disestablishments in New Brunswick
New Brunswick